Oggevatn is a village in Birkenes municipality in Agder county, Norway. The village is located on the western shore of the large lake Ogge, just north of the municipal border with Iveland. The Sørlandsbanen railway line runs through the village.

References

Villages in Agder
Birkenes